Michael Cobb (born December 20, 1955) is a former American football tight end in the National Football League (NFL).

Cobb played football for Michigan State University. He was selected in the first round (22nd overall) by the Cincinnati Bengals in the 1977 NFL Draft. He played five seasons for the Bengals and the Chicago Bears. After playing one season with the Bengals, he was traded to the Bears for whom he played from 1978 through 1981. Cobb also played for the Michigan Panthers in the United States Football League (USFL) during the 1983 and 1984 seasons where he caught 118 passes for 1,319 yards with 10 touchdowns.

He is a cousin of Sherman Smith, a former running back and former running backs coach for the Seattle Seahawks.

References

1955 births
Living people
Players of American football from Youngstown, Ohio
American football tight ends
Michigan State Spartans football players
Cincinnati Bengals players
Chicago Bears players
Michigan Panthers players